Mary O'Connor may refer to:

Arts and media
 Mary O'Connor, a poor servant, subject of the 19th century Irish ballad "The Rose of Tralee" 
 Mary O'Connor (died 2013), Hugh Hefner's secretary, frequent guest on The Girls Next Door
"There's Something About Mary O'Connor", episode of The Girls Next Door
 Mary Flannery O'Connor, American writer
 Mary H. O'Connor (1872–1959), American screenwriter and film editor
 Mary Murillo (1888–1944), born Mary O'Connor, English-born U.S. actress turned screenwriter

Politics
 Mary O'Connor (Illinois politician) (born 1959), Chicago alderman
 Mary Mitchell O'Connor (born 1959), politician

Sportswomen
 Mary O'Connor (runner) (born 1955), retired long-distance runner from New Zealand
 Mary O'Connor (Irish sportsperson) (born 1977), camogie and Gaelic football player and official
 Mary Anne O'Connor (born 1953), American Olympic basketball player

Other people
 Mary Agnes O'Connor (1815–1859), Irish Sisters of Mercy nun and social worker
 Mary O'Connor, a relevant party to the court case Matter of O'Connor, 1988

Fictional characters
 Mary O'Connor, character in The Prince of Avenue A
 Mary O'Connor, character in London Bridge (TV series)
 Mary Anastasia O'Connor, the character Maisie Ravier's alter ego in the Maisie series of films

See also
Mary Connor (disambiguation)